A Gifted Man is an American fantasy medical drama television series that premiered on CBS on September 23, 2011. The series is about a talented but self-absorbed surgeon (Patrick Wilson) who starts questioning his purpose in life when he is visited by the spirit of his deceased ex-wife (Jennifer Ehle). The pilot episode was directed by Jonathan Demme, who also served as an executive producer on the show along with writer Susannah Grant. The first thirteen episodes were aired in the Friday 8:00 p.m. timeslot (September 23, 2011 – February 10, 2012), while the final three episodes of the 16 episode season order were aired in the Friday 9:00 p.m. timeslot (February 17, 2012 – March 2, 2012).

On May 10, 2012, CBS canceled the series after one season.

Synopsis
Michael Holt (Patrick Wilson) is a talented but self-absorbed surgeon at an upscale New York City clinic. He lives a comfortable and materialistic life due to the wealthy clients he treats, but is nevertheless discontented with his life and acts coldly to those around him. His life is thrown into disarray, however, when he is visited by the ghost of his ex-wife Anna Paul (Jennifer Ehle), who was recently killed in a car accident. Anna asks Michael to help keep running the free clinic she previously directed, which leads Michael to be exposed to poorer patients in need who are far different from his usual clientele. Michael's sister Christina (Julie Benz), a single mother struggling to care for her troubled teenaged son Milo (Liam Aiken), believes in the supernatural and is thrilled with the idea that Anna is back in Michael's life, as she insists he was a better person when she was around.

Cast and characters

Main cast
 Patrick Wilson as Dr. Michael Holt, a brilliant neurosurgeon and owner of Holt Neuro. Following Anna's death, he starts volunteering at Clinica Sanando.
 Jennifer Ehle as Anna Paul, Michael's ex-wife, who has come back as a spirit attached to him. She only appears to Michael.
 Margo Martindale as Rita Perkins-Hall, Michael's loyal, headstrong assistant. Rita is a former nurse.
 Pablo Schreiber as Anton Little Creek, a shaman and spiritual healer who helps Michael understand his otherworldly experiences. He is a longtime friend and former lover of Michael's sister Christina. Anton also works as a handyman at Clinica Sanando.
 Rachelle Lefevre as Dr. Kate Sykora, a doctor who takes over as director at Clinica Sanando after Anna's death.

Recurring cast
 Rhys Coiro as Dr. Zeke Barnes, a physician working at Clinica Sanando.
 Afton Williamson as Autumn, a social worker volunteering at Clinica Sanando.
 Julie Benz as Christina Holt, Michael's sister.
 Liam Aiken as Christina's son Milo Holt, Michael's nephew
 Eriq La Salle as Evan "E-Mo" Morris, a psychiatrist-neurologist at Holt Neuro and Michael's personal friend.
 Mike Doyle as Victor Lantz, the anesthesiologist at Holt Neuro.
 Adrian Martinez as Hector, the desk clerk at Clinica Sanando.
 Peter Hermann as Harrison Curtis, Kate's husband.
 Katie Ross as Maria, a nurse at Holt Neuro.
 Sue Jean Kim as Colette

Production
A Gifted Man is produced by CBS Television Studios and Timberman-Beverly Productions. Jonathan Demme, Susannah Grant, Sarah Timberman, Carl Beverly and Neal Baer are executive producers. Demme directed and Loucas George produced the pilot episode.

On November 14, 2011, CBS ordered three additional episodes of the series, bringing the total to 16 for the season.

Episodes 
With the exception of the pilot episode, every episode title begins with the words "In Case of...".

Reception
During an early review of the pilot episode, HitFix writer Daniel Fienberg praised the cast as well as Demme's direction, although he questioned whether the show would be as good without Demme and feared the premise could become predictable.

The show was given a 65 out of 100 on Metacritic, indicating generally favorable reviews. David Hinckley of the New York Daily News gave the show three stars out of five, saying "The cast here nails their roles, from Wilson down to support players like Emmy winner Margo Martindale as his loyal assistant, Rita. Ehle has a much trickier role and handles it well. It’s a show that wants to say something. Now it needs viewers who want to listen." Mary McNamara of the Los Angeles Times said "with just a few tiny modifications, A Gifted Man could be a smart satiric comedy, but I don’t think that is what Grant is shooting for," poking fun at Julie Benz's character's cosmic beliefs and dysfunctional family. Matthew Gilbert of The Boston Globe compared the show to Grey's Anatomy, saying "[the show] needs to transcend that limited and overused construct, and set the characters free from endless debate over whether Anna is real or not. Let the actors find drama in more earthly concerns. I think they’re up to it." Robert Bianco of USA Today says "Wilson has the magnetism and acting chops to lead a network series. [Gifted Man] could not have been given better actors. It needs to give them better in return." Phil Dyess-Nugent and Emily VanDerWerff of The A.V. Club gave the pilot a B rating.

Ratings

See also 
 List of ghost films
 Saving Hope

References

External links
 

2010s American workplace drama television series
2011 American television series debuts
2012 American television series endings
Ghosts in television
CBS original programming
English-language television shows
American fantasy television series
2010s American medical television series
Television series by CBS Studios
Television shows set in New York City
Television shows filmed in New York (state)
American fantasy drama television series